Buulo Togoro is a town in the central Hiran region of Somalia.

References

Populated places in Hiran, Somalia